Kattuppakkam is a village in the taluk of Nemili, in Vellore district in the Indian state of Tamil Nadu.

References

Cities and towns in Vellore district